Lily of the Valley is the debut studio album by Irish alternative rock band Funeral Suits. It was released on 4 June 2012, by Model Citizen Records.

Singles
The first track from album, "Machines" was released as a music video on 5 February 2009.

On 14 April 2011, Funeral Suits released the second music video "Colour Fade".

Critical reception
In a review for DIY, El Hunt wrote: "On the ominously named Lily Of The Valley - with all its symbolic associations with death and mourning — the listener happily gobbles it up for breakfast lunch and tea. This is in part due to the band's impressive command of their craft, and also the album's place in the almost foolproof hands of Stephen Street." At The 405, critic reviewer Alex Walker noted: "Although the record is not revolutionary, nor would it have been even if had been released a year and a half ago. It is however a very solid debut release; heartfelt and sincere, brimming with a variety of well conceived ideas. The band have a genuine knack for crafting big, epic, extravagant guitar moments complimented throughout by intelligent electronic arrangements."

Track listing

References

External links
 Lily of the Valley at Bandcamp
 
 

2012 debut albums
Rubyworks Records albums